P. lutea may refer to:

 Pachycondyla lutea, a ponerine ant
 Pachystachys lutea, an evergreen shrub
 Paederota lutea, a dicotyledonous plant
 Paeonia lutea, a plant with large flowers
 Parkia lutea, a plant with small-petaled flowers
 Partula lutea, an extinct snail
 Passiflora lutea, a plant native to North America
 Patella lutea, a true limpet
 Pedois lutea, a concealer moth
 Pelidnota lutea, a scarab beetle
 Penthophera lutea, an owlet moth
 Phacelia lutea, a New World plant
 Phaeosia lutea, a North American moth
 Phillipsia lutea, an apothecial fungus
 Phlebotomus lutea, a sand fly
 Pimpinella lutea, a flowering plant
 Pinguicula lutea, a carnivorous plant
 Piranga lutea, an American songbird
 Placea lutea, a plant endemic to Chile
 Plumeria lutea, a deciduous plant
 Polygala lutea, a flowering plant
 Porites lutea, a stony coral
 Portulaca lutea, a moss rose
 Primula lutea, a southeastern European primrose
 Primulina lutea, an African violet
 Proboscidea lutea, a plant native to South America
 Prosotas lutea, an Asian butterfly
 Protogautieria lutea, a basidiomycete fungus
 Pseudocoremia lutea, a geometer moth
 Pseudofumaria lutea, a perennial plant
 Pseudohalonectria lutea, a sac fungus
 Pseudomonas lutea, a rod-shaped bacterium
 Pseudopoda lutea, a huntsman spider
 Psychotria lutea, a flowering plant
 Pyura lutea, a sessile ascidian